James Alfred Wallace (April 7, 1929 – April 14, 2000) was an American baseball catcher in the Negro leagues. He played with the Newark/Houston Eagles in 1948 and 1949. In 1950, he split time between the Ottawa Nationals of the Border League and the Bridgeport Bees in the Colonial League.

Wallace served in the United States Armed Forces during the Korean War and lost part of his left hand in a grenade explosion, ending his baseball career.

References

External links
 and Seamheads

1929 births
2000 deaths
Baseball players from New Jersey
Baseball catchers
Newark Eagles players
Houston Eagles players
Bridgeport Bees players
Sportspeople from Elizabeth, New Jersey
American military personnel of the Korean War
Military personnel from New Jersey
20th-century African-American sportspeople